Church of St. Nicholas was a Serbian Orthodox church located in Donje Nerodimlje, in the municipality of Uroševac, Kosovo and Metohija. It belonged to the Diocese of Raška and Prizren of the Serbian Orthodox Church and it was destroyed by Kosovo Albanians in 1999.

Architecture 
The church in Donje Nerodimlje was dedicated to Saint Nicholas, and was rebuilt in 1983 on the foundations of the former Orthodox temple. It was built as a single nave building with an altar apse. A century-old oak tree stood there and the believers used to gather there even while the church was in ruins.

The destruction of the church in 1999 
After the arrival of the US KFOR forces in 1999, the church was damaged, burned and destroyed by Kosovo Albanians. At the same time, a giant black pine tree, which was planted at the time of Emperor Dušan, was cut down and burned. The cemetery was desecrated and the gravestones were demolished.

References

External links 
 The list of destroyed and desecrated churches in Kosovo and Metohija June-October 1999 (Списак уништених и оскрнављених цркава на Косову и Метохији јун-октобар 1999)

Serbian Orthodox church buildings in Kosovo
Destroyed churches in Kosovo
Persecution of Serbs
Former Serbian Orthodox churches
20th-century Serbian Orthodox church buildings
Religious organizations established in the 1980s
Christian organizations established in 1983
Ferizaj
Cultural heritage of Kosovo